Kamarasavalli is a village in the Ariyalur taluk of Ariyalur district, Tamil Nadu, India.

Demographics 

As per the 2001 census, Kamarasavalli had a total population of 3137 with 1618 males and 1519 females.

References 

Villages in Ariyalur district